Henry Bembridge (born 27 June 1852) was an English cricketer. He was a right-handed batsman and a right-arm fast bowler who played for Nottinghamshire. He was born in Bulwell.

Bembridge made a single first-class appearance, in a County Match against Yorkshire in 1878. Batting at number eleven, Bembridge scored 15 runs in the first innings, and two runs in the second.

External links 
 Henry Bembridge at Cricket Archive 

1852 births
English cricketers
Nottinghamshire cricketers
People from Bulwell
Cricketers from Nottinghamshire
Year of death missing